Infinite Crisis was a 2015 multiplayer online battle arena (MOBA) video game based on the fictional universe of DC Comics, developed by Turbine and published by Warner Bros. Interactive Entertainment, loosely based on the comic book series of the same name. The game featured two squads of DC heroes and villains as they competed in combats across multiple destructive battlefields featuring in-game changing catastrophic events. It was a free-to-play game that was supported by micro-transactions.

In Infinite Crisis, players assumed the role of a character called "champion", each character having a set of unique abilities, battling with a team against other players or computer-controlled champions. In the most popular game mode, players controlled their champions, destroying enemy turrets and completing the set objectives. In order to win, each team's goal was to destroy the opposing team's power core, a building inside the enemy base.  This goal was achieved by destroying enemy drones and turrets.

As of August 14, 2015, Infinite Crisis and its servers were shut down.

Gameplay
Infinite Crisis was a multiplayer online battle where players controlled a "champion" within a set, short amount of time depending on the game mode. Players gained levels by destroying drones and killing opposing team's champions and turrets. In the classic game mode, the map was divided into three lanes; top, middle and bottom. Top and bottom lanes were longer and had more space between each turret. Mid lane was the shortest route to the enemy's base, but both sides were flanked with urban jungle, providing more strategic game-play for a surprise attack ("gank"). Each lane had a set of inner and outer turrets, one set for the player side and the other for the enemy. Turrets were lethal defensive structures that helped to protect players from enemy champions and helped clear enemy drones. Each bases had three 'dampeners', found at the base entrance. Dampeners were like turrets, but after being destroyed re-spawned minutes later; their 'health' was reduced with each re-spawn. When a dampener was destroyed, the opposing enemy spawned a tougher drone. Base Cameras provided the ability to scout for enemies for a brief period of time. Urban jungle was located beyond a turret's vision, concealed by the fog-of-war. The jungle held four types of neutral drone camps: East Medium, Destroyer and Unique. In the jungle camp, defeating a destroyer camp spawned four different deployables: Health, Speed, Surveillance Tower, and EMP. The objective of the game was to destroy drones in order to level champions which could destroy turrets and then the Power Core in order to win the game.

Game modes
Infinite Crisis was a session-based game. Each match lasted up to 20 to 40 minutes of game-play. Enemies had to either capture the points and drain the Power Core, or destroy the Power Core to win the game.

Crime Alley 
Crime Alley is the site of Thomas and Martha Wayne's murder in the Gaslight Universe and the Prime Universe. This a 1 vs. AI private map designed for new and intermediate players to practice their champion. The map features one lane, one power core turret for each team, one dampener and a single lane turret for each team. The map also features a single jungle lanes for players to experiment with deployables. This map is mostly used to practice or play against another opponent to fight out who is the better skilled player. In order to win, the player needs to destroy the opponents Power Core.

Gotham Divided
In this 5 vs. 5 three-lane map, players can take advantage of the urban jungle by defeating neutral creatures to earn deployable powers and abilities like meteor strikes, EMP blasts and agility.  Gotham Divided has two bases: one for your team and one for the enemy. Players objective is to destroy the Power Core inside the enemy base, achieved by destroying enemy drones, turrets, and eventually dampeners. This map is the most popular and main map of the game.

Gotham Heights
This 5 vs. 5 map features a capture and hold map. The map is shaped like a circle and there are 5 control points. Each control point is located at the end points of a pentagon shape. The five control points start as neutral, a player may capture the point by standing on it and the capture speed is dramatically increased as more players stand at the point. In order to win the game mode, the player needs to capture majority of the control points as the enemy Power Core health slowly drains. At the center of the map, the orbital cannon is located; the players needs to capture the Orbital Cannon in order to summon stronger drones that would help players capture control points. In the Urban Jungle section, beyond the visible circular lane, it holds speed boost, health packs and the orbital cannon.

Coast City
Is a 5 vs. 5 map that features two-lane map, a large Urban Jungle that holds access to Elite Drones and control of the Doomsday Device. In order to win, players must outmaneuver the enemy team by pushing into their base and destroy its Power Core. The Doomsday Device activates and creates a neutral guardian who attacks the closest Champion in his arena. After defeating the neutral guardian, the guardian drops a device that could be picked up and use to fire at nearby enemy or use it as EMP to blast and stun structures.

Story
When a sudden assault threatens the DC Multiverse where it would have it stand on the brink of destruction, the only hope to combat it is within the different heroes and villains.

Playable Characters
 Aquaman
 Atrocitus
 Batman
 Gaslight Batman
 Nightmare Batman
 Blue Beetle
 Catwoman
 Gaslight Catwoman
 Cyborg
 Doomsday
 The Flash
 Green Arrow
 Green Lantern
 Arcane Green Lantern
 Atomic Green Lantern
 Harley Quinn
 Hawkgirl
 The Joker
 Atomic Joker
 Gaslight Joker
 Katana
 Krypto
 Lex Luthor
 Poison Ivy
 Atomic Poison Ivy
 Robin
 Nightmare Robin
 Shazam
 Sinestro
 Solomon Grundy
 Star Sapphire
 Stargirl
 Starro
 Supergirl
 Arcane Supergirl
 Superman
 Mecha Superman
 Nightmare Superman
 Swamp Thing
 Wonder Woman
 Atomic Wonder Woman
 Mecha Wonder Woman
 Zatanna

Development
Infinite Crisis is Turbine's first original title since the company's purchase by Warner Brothers in 2010, and the first non-massively multiplayer online role-playing game produced by the studio.

Infinite Crisis began closed beta testing on May 8, 2013. The game went into open beta on March 14, 2014. The team planned on continually introducing new heroes and villains from the multiverse as well as adding in new maps and game modes even as the game was fully released. The game was released on Steam on March 26, 2015. On June 2, 2015, Warner Bros. Interactive Entertainment announced that Infinite Crisis will be shut down in August.

Reception

IGN awarded the game a score of 6.9 out of 10, saying "Infinite Crisis does cool things with its character roles and lore, but lacks enough accessible modes." GameSpot awarded it 6.0 out of 10, saying "you might have expected to see more effort to mask the face of gameplay we've seen regurgitated over the past few years." PC Gamer awarded it 6.0 out 10, saying "Play it for its novel ideas, not because you love Batman. Dwindling player numbers are a cause for concern." On Metacritic, it has a rating of 68 out of 100.

Digital Comic Adaptation 
A 12 part digital miniseries was released, set in the same world as the videogame, written by Dan Abnett.

References

External links
 
 Infinite Crisis wiki

2015 video games
Products and services discontinued in 2015
Free-to-play video games
Multiplayer online battle arena games
Video games based on DC Comics
Video games developed in the United States
Video games set in the United States
Video games set in California
Video games about parallel universes
Warner Bros. video games
Windows games
Windows-only games
Inactive multiplayer online games